Sherin Shringar (born 5 May 1985), known by her stage name  Sherin or Shirin is an Indian actress, who has appeared in Tamil, Kannada, Malayalam and Telugu-language films. After making her debut in Kannada films, her notable films include  Thulluvadho Ilamai (2002), and  Whistle (2003). In 2019, Sherin participated in Bigg Boss Tamil season 3 and emerged as the 3rd runner up.

Career
Shringar made her debut as an actress in Kannada films through Police Dog (2002) before playing a lead role in Dhruva (2002), in which she starred alongside Darshan.

Sherin won critical acclaim and box office success through her debut Tamil film, Kasthuri Raja's coming-of-age drama Thulluvadho Ilamai (2002). Starring opposite Dhanush in his acting debut, the film garnered publicity prior to release for its music by Yuvan Shankar Raja and its adult story written by Selvaraghavan. It subsequently became a commercial success at the box office, effectively launching the careers of Sherin and Dhanush. The actress won the Cinema Express Award for Most Popular Actress for her performance, while she later went on to star in the Telugu remake titled Juniors (2003). Sherin then appeared in supporting roles alongside senior actresses Ramya Krishnan in Jaya (2002) and Simran in Kovilpatti Veeralakshmi (2003), and also garnered attention for her negative role in the horror film Whistle (2003) and her role opposite debutant Sibi Sathyaraj in Student Number 1 (2003). Sherin later moved on to work on Telugu and Malayalam films, appearing in Krishna Vamsi's thriller drama Danger (2005).

In the late 2000s, Sherin's offers as a leading actress began to decrease, and several films she had starred in were subsequently delayed or shelved. A return to Kannada films with Bhoopathi and the Tamil action drama Urchagam (2007), both fared badly at the box office. A six-film contract with SPR Productions did not materialise as expected, while Cash and Maya with Shaam and the S. J. Surya-starrer Vil were dropped midway through production. She notably appeared in an item song in Linguswamy's Bheema (2008) alongside Vikram and in R. Ananth Raju's Mast Maja Maadi (2008) alongside Upendra and eleven other actresses. She portrayed a role with negative shades in the Kannada film Yogi (2009). Other films including the Kannada film Sihigali and the Tamil film Poova Thalaiya, had delayed low-key releases in 2010. Sherin subsequently chose to take a career sabbatical in the late 2000s, and briefly took up a course in Art and Culture in Sydney.

She made a return to Kannada films through Om Prakash Rao's AK 56 (2012) alongside Siddhanth, which garnered a good commercial response. Her next release, the comedy drama Nanbenda (2015), saw her appear in a supporting role, where she was paired opposite comedian Santhanam. In 2019, she took part as a contestant in the Tamil reality television show, Bigg Boss Tamil 3.

Filmography

Film

Television

References

External links 
 

Living people
Actresses in Tamil cinema
Actresses in Telugu cinema
Actresses in Kannada cinema
Actresses in Malayalam cinema
21st-century Indian actresses
Indian film actresses
Actresses from Bangalore
Female models from Bangalore
Bigg Boss (Tamil TV series) contestants
1985 births